Ohio's 32nd senatorial district has historically been based in the Mahoning Valley.  Currently it consists of the counties of Ashtabula and Trumbull as well as portions of Geauga county. It encompasses Ohio House districts 63, 64 and 99. It has a Cook PVI of D+12.  Its current Ohio Senator is Republican Sandra O'Brien.

List of senators

References

External links
Ohio's 32nd district senator at the 133rd Ohio General Assembly official website

Ohio State Senate districts